
Gmina Trzcinica is a rural gmina (administrative district) in Kępno County, Greater Poland Voivodeship, in west-central Poland.

Villages
Gmina Trzcinica contains the villages and settlements of Aniołka Druga, Aniołka Pierwsza, Aniołka-Parcele, Borek, Dzierżążnik, Granice, Ignacówka Pierwsza, Ignacówka Trzecia, Jelenia Głowa, Kuźnica Trzcińska, Kwasielina, Laski, Laski-Tartak, Nowa Wieś, Piotrówka, Pomiany, Różyczka, Siemionka, Smardze, Teklin, Trzcinica and Wodziczna.

Neighbouring gminas
Gmina Trzcinica is bordered by the gminas of Baranów, Byczyna, Łęka Opatowska, Rychtal and Wołczyn.

References
Polish official population figures 2006

Trzcinica
Kępno County